The Hutchinson-Blood House is a historic house at 394-396 Main Street in Winchester, Massachusetts, United States. The 2.5-story wood-frame house was built around 1840 by John Coats, a local housewright.  The Greek Revival house was built by Coats for his in-laws, Samuel and Lucetta Hutchinson.  It is basically Federal in styling, although it has a Greek Revival entry surround.  The main house has had a two-story addition added to the rear, as well as a side porch.

The house was listed on the National Register of Historic Places in 1989.

See also
Hovey-Winn House, another Coats house, located next door
National Register of Historic Places listings in Winchester, Massachusetts

References

Houses on the National Register of Historic Places in Winchester, Massachusetts
Houses in Winchester, Massachusetts